Jónas Þór Næs (born 27 December 1986) is a Faroese retired international footballer.

He played professionally for BK Frem in 2005-06 and again 2009–10. Næs previously played for Valur (2011–13), Fremad Amager (2007–08), Køge BK (2008–09), Argja Bóltfelag (2007), NSÍ Runavík (2008) and B36 (2013-16).

Career

Club career
In November 2010 he signed a two-year contract with Icelandic club Valur.

In December 2016 he signed a contract with Icelandic club ÍBV.

He made his international debut for the Faroe Islands in 2008.

Coaching career
Retiring at the end of 2019, he continued as a youth coach at B36. Næs already worked as a coach for the club's U9 team in the 2019 season alongside his football career.

References

External links
 KSI profile

1986 births
Living people
Faroese footballers
Faroese expatriate footballers
Faroe Islands international footballers
Boldklubben Frem players
Argja Bóltfelag players
Køge Boldklub players
NSÍ Runavík players
B36 Tórshavn players
EB/Streymur players
Valur (men's football) players
Fremad Amager players
Íþróttabandalag Vestmannaeyja players
Association football defenders
Faroe Islands youth international footballers
Faroese expatriate sportspeople in Iceland
Expatriate men's footballers in Denmark
Expatriate footballers in Iceland